Rysops scintilla is a butterfly in the family Lycaenidae. It is the sole representative of the monotypic genus Rysops.
It is found on Madagascar, and its habitat consists of forests.

References

Butterflies described in 1857
Polyommatini